Juliana Santi Schalch (born April 23, 1985) is a Brazilian actress who has appeared in several films and telenovelas.

Biography 
She was born in São Paulo, and graduated in Performing Arts in 2006, at the Oficina de Atores Nilton Travesso.  Her great-grandfather was a native of Switzerland. She is also a descendant of Portuguese and Italian immigrants.

Career 
Juliana Schalch's first work was in the film Formigamento, in 2004, and in 2007 she appeared in the film Dorian. Her first work in a telenovela, played Juliana Galvão in 2008, Rede Globo's telenovela Três Irmãs. She played the girlfriend of Lt. Col. Nascimento's son in the 2010 film Elite Squad: The Enemy Within, then in 2011 she was cast as Lara Vilanova in the telenovela Morde & Assopra. The actress in the same year played Camila in the 2011 film Os 3. Juliana Schalch plays the First Daughter of the President of Brazil in the 2012 miniseries O Brado Retumbante. Her character, named Marta Ventura, suffers bipolar disorder. She has also appeared in the same year in the film Os Penetras. Juliana Schalch was cast to play one of the lead roles, a call girl named Luna, in the 2013 HBO television series O Negócio.

Filmography

Television

Cinema

References

External links 

1985 births
Living people
People from São Paulo
Brazilian people of Swiss-German descent
Brazilian people of Portuguese descent
Brazilian people of Italian descent
Brazilian film actresses
Brazilian television actresses
Actresses from São Paulo